Marvin Allen may refer to:
 Marvin Allen (wide receiver) (born 1983), American football wide receiver for the London Warriors
 Marvin Allen (running back) (born 1965), retired American football player for the New England Patriots
 Marvin Allen (soccer) (1915–1996), collegiate head soccer coach